The Real Story is a radio programme hosted by  Carrie Gracie on the BBC World Service. Each episode of the weekly programme covers one topic in-depth for 50 minutes, featuring a panel of experts.

Prior to 22 February 2018, the programme was known as Newshour Extra, and was hosted by Newshour host Owen Bennett-Jones.

References

Real Story